Elsa Pollak (1911 - 2006) was an Israeli sculptor and an Holocaust survivor, born in Slovakia. She is known for depicting the victims of the Holocaust in her art.

Life 
Pollak was born in the village of Markušovce.In 1944, she was deported to Auschwitz along with her entire family and assigned the number 5170. She was the only survivor, being liberated from the labor camp of Lenzing, Austria after having partaken in the Death March from Auschwitz.

After the end of the World War II, Elsa studied sculpture in Vienna along with the sculptor and painter Kurt Goebel. In 1962, she emigrated to Israel and settled in Herzliya. In 1991, she received the Sussman Prize for Artists Depicting the Holocaust awarded by the Yad Vashem.

Works 

Pollak co-authored The Pit memorial, along with a Belarus artist Leonid Levin located at the site where Nazi forces shot about 5,000 Jewish residents of the nearby Minsk Ghetto.

Her sculpture exhibition Elsa Pollak: Auschwitz 5170, named after her prisoner number in Auschwitz is one of the two permanent exhibitions displayed at the Ghetto Fighters' House in Israel.

In her art, she drew from her own experience at the Auschwitz concentration camp, in her own words: "Man created these horrors, but did not invent a language in which to describe them. The memories stayed alive and urged me on without respite. And thus I arrived at sculpture."

References 

1911 births
2006 deaths
Israeli women sculptors
20th-century Israeli sculptors
Israeli people of Slovak-Jewish descent
People from Spišská Nová Ves District
Slovak Jews
Auschwitz concentration camp survivors